The St. Louis Golf Classic was a golf tournament on the Nike Tour. It ran from 1994 to 1998. From 1994 to 1996 it was played at Lake Forest Golf & Country Club in Lake St. Louis, Missouri. In 1997 and 1998 it was played at Missouri Bluffs Golf Course in St. Charles.

In 1998 the winner earned $40,500.

Winners

Notes

Former Korn Ferry Tour events
Golf in Missouri
St. Louis Golf Classic
Recurring sporting events established in 1994
Recurring sporting events disestablished in 1998